This is a list of flag bearers who have represented Croatia at the Olympics.

Flag bearers carry the national flag of their country at the opening ceremony of the Olympic Games.

See also
Croatia at the Olympics
List of flag bearers for Yugoslavia at the Olympics

References

Flag bearers
Olympic flag bearers
Croatia